The 2013–14 Georgia Tech Yellow Jackets men's basketball team represented the Georgia Institute of Technology during the 2013–14 NCAA Division I men's basketball season. They are led by third year head coach Brian Gregory and played their home games at McCamish Pavilion. They were members of the Atlantic Coast Conference. They finished the season 16–17, 6–12 in ACC play to finish in a three-way tie for 11th place. They advanced to the second round of the ACC tournament where they lost to Clemson.

Roster

Schedule

|-
!colspan=9 style="background:#000080; color:#D4AF37;"| Exhibition

|-
!colspan=9 style="background:#000080; color:#D4AF37;"| Non-conference regular season

|-
!colspan=9 style="background:#000080; color:#D4AF37;"| ACC regular season
|-

|-
!colspan=9 style="background:#000080; color:#D4AF37;"| ACC tournament

References

Georgia Tech Yellow Jackets men's basketball seasons
Georgia Tech
2013 in sports in Georgia (U.S. state)
2014 in sports in Georgia (U.S. state)